Data Technologies and Applications (DTA) is a peer-reviewed academic, interdisciplinary journal concerning any topic related to web science, data analytics and digital information management. It is published quarterly by Emerald Group Publishing Limited. 

The journal was previously called Program: Electronic Library and Information Systems but in 2018 the name changed to Data Technologies and Applications.

According to the Journal Citation Reports, the journal has a 2016 impact factor of 0.556.

References

External links 
 Journal information
 Table of Contents
 Previous version of the journal homepage

Cultural journals
Computer science journals
Emerald Group Publishing academic journals
Publications established in 1966